Manipulation is a 1991 British animated short film written and directed by Daniel Greaves. The film won the Academy Award for Best Animated Short Film at the 64th Academy Awards.

References

External links
 
 Watch Manipulation at Daniel Greaves' website

1991 films
1991 animated films
1990s animated short films
British animated short films
Best Animated Short Academy Award winners
Animated films without speech
1990s English-language films
1990s British films